Bang Nok Khwaek is a tambon (subdistrict) of Bang Khonthi District, Samut Songkhram Province, central Thailand.

History
Originally, this area was called "Ban Pho Ngam" (บ้านโพธิ์งาม), but because there are many black-crowned night herons (Nycticorax nycticorax) to live. The locals therefore changed the name to "Bang Nok Khwaek" like today, which means "place of black-crowned night herons". In addition, this species of bird is also used as a seal of the district.

Later, during World War II, the Imperial Japanese Army had bombed Bang Nok Khwaek Watergate, in order not to transfer oil through, but did not damage anything. This is believed to be a miracle from the local sacred Buddha image namely Luang Pho To (หลวงพ่อโต) that provides protection.

Geography

Most of the area consisting of lowlands along the Mae Klong  River, thus making the soil fertile suitable for planting with rivers and khlongs flowing through. Most areas are orchards. Bang Nok Khwaek regarded as the northernmost part of the district.

Neighboring tambons are (from the north clockwise): Si Muen of Damnoen Saduak District, Ratchaburi Province, Bang Khonthi, and Bang Yi Rong of its district, respectively.

Administration
The area is administered by the Subdistrict-municipality Bang Nok Khwaek (เทศบาลตำบลบางนกแขวก).

Bang Nok Khwaek  also consists of seven mubans (villages).

Sights
At present, Bang Nok Khwaek is well known as a tourist attraction in Samut Songkhram Province. There are many interesting places include:
Nativity of Our Lady Cathedral, one of most beautiful and highest Catholic churches in Thailand, located on the bank of Mae Khlong River, it is more than 100 years old, using the French Gothic style of art.
Bang Nok Khwaek Floating Market, a local market and historic community, with over 100th years of history on the Mae Klong River. Considered the only floating market in Thailand that is adjacent to the main river.
Wat Charoen Sukaram Worawiharn, a royal Thai temple which is a sacred Buddha image enshrined, Luang Pho To, located about 18 km (11 mi) away from the downtown Samut Songkhram. Another interesting thing here is its natural fish sanctuary, a habitat of hundreds of thousands of Java barb (Barbonymus gonionotus), and red tailed tinfoil (B. altus), including some giant gourami (Osphronemus goramy). The giant gourami here are special abilities, they can eat rice noodles or pork balls from the vendor's hand.

Local products
Thai sweets
Biodiesel
Fruit preserves
Authentic coconut oil

Notable people
Apidej Sit-Hirun, former Muay Thai kickboxer and professional boxer

References

Tambon of Samut Songkhram Province